OnFaith is a commercial website of OnFaith, Inc., Austin, Texas, for sharing and commenting on faith-based content such as scripture, sermons and religious music.

The founders promote their site onfaith.co as a kind of "Wikipedia for faith". An advisory board with members spanning religions helps ensure that religious content is accurate.

Onfaith.co was formerly known as deily.org.

History 
OnFaith was founded in 2014 by former uShip executive Shawn Bose and former eBay executive Justin Halloran, announcing initial seed funding of $1 million.

Following a soft launch in October 2014, the website officially launched in December 2014 with more than 100,000 pieces of content.

In August 2015, OnFaith Inc. announced an additional $2 million in seed funding, bringing the company's funding total to $3 million.

References

External links 
 

American companies established in 2014
Companies based in Austin, Texas
Online companies of the United States
2014 establishments in Texas